Regulation (EU) 2017/746 (IVDR) is a regulation of the European Union on the placing on the market and putting into service of in vitro diagnostic medical devices (IVD), repealing Directive 98/79/EC (IVDD), which also concerned IVD. The regulation was published in April 2017 and is closely aligned to the EU regulation on medical devices.
Changes compared to the IVDD include changes in device classification, stricter oversight of manufacturers by Notified Bodies, introduction of the "Person Responsible for Regulatory Compliance" (PRRC), the requirement of UDI marking for devices, common specifications, Eudamed registration, and increased post-market surveillance activities.

Classification
The regulation introduces the classification of IVD in the risk classes A, B, C, and D (§47). There are seven classification rules that are given in Annex VIII. MDCG guidance 2020-16 provides clarification of the classification rules and gives classification examples. Only devices in the lowest risk class, class A, are excluded from the requirement of notified body oversight.

See also
 The Medical Devices Regulation (MDR (EU) 2017/745)

References

External links
Text of the regulation
Medtech Europe Whitepaper on IVDR Changes
Medical Device Regulations – Links You Should Be Aware Of

European Union regulations
Regulation of medical devices
Regulation in the European Union